Chlumčany is a municipality and village in Plzeň-South District in the Plzeň Region of the Czech Republic. It has about 2,400 inhabitants.

Administrative parts
The village of Hradčany is an administrative part of Chlumčany.

References

Villages in Plzeň-South District